Mathilda May (born Karin Haïm; 8 February 1965) is a French film actress.

Early life
May was born in Paris, France. Her father, playwright Victor Haïm, is of Sephardic Jewish (Greek-Jewish and Turkish-Jewish) descent. Her mother is the Swedish ballet teacher and choreographer Margareta Hanson. At age 16 May won the "Premier Prix du Conservatoire de Danse de Paris" (First Prize of the Paris Dance Conservatory).

Career
May's film work is primarily in French and made for the European market; she was the recipient of the Prix Romy Schneider in 1989. Non-French films she has appeared in include Naked Tango (1991), Becoming Colette (1991) and The Tit and the Moon (1994). In the United States she is best known for her role as an alien vampire in the 1985 science fiction-horror film Lifeforce, directed by Tobe Hooper, in which she is naked for most of her performance. She also appeared in the 1996 space adventure game Privateer 2: The Darkening. She played Isabella in The Jackal, a 1997 action film.

May recorded an album in 1992 called Joy of Love.

May was the writer and director for the theater show Open Space, which was performed in the Théâtre Jean-Vilar in the commune of Suresnes, the Théâtre du Rond-Point, and the Théâtre de Paris from 2013 to 2015.

Personal life
May has been married three times: Her first husband was Paul Powell. Her second husband was Gérard Darmon, with whom she has two children, daughter Sarah (born 17 August 1994) and son Jules (born 4 March 1997). Her third husband was Philippe Kelly.

Filmography

Further reading

References

External links

Mathilda May at Allmovie
Mathilda May at Yahoo! Movies

1965 births
Living people
20th-century French Sephardi Jews
21st-century French Sephardi Jews
20th-century French actresses
21st-century French actresses
French film actresses
French people of Greek-Jewish descent
French people of Turkish-Jewish descent
French people of Swedish descent
Jewish French actresses
Mizrahi Jews
Actresses from Paris
French television actresses
Most Promising Actress César Award winners